2003 Empress's Cup Final was the 25th final of the Empress's Cup competition. The final was played at National Stadium in Tokyo on January 25, 2004. Tasaki Perule FC won the championship.

Overview
Defending champion Tasaki Perule FC won their 3rd title, by defeating Nippon TV Beleza on a penalty shoot-out. Tasaki Perule FC won the title for 2 years in a row.

Match details

See also
2003 Empress's Cup

References

Empress's Cup
2003 in Japanese women's football
Japanese Women's Cup Final 2003